The Strange Love of Molly Louvain  is a 1932 American pre-Code crime drama film directed by Michael Curtiz and starring Ann Dvorak and Lee Tracy. The script was based on the play Tinsel Girl by Maurine Dallas Watkins.

Plot
Molly Louvain is a young woman who has a baby out of wedlock.  She falls in with a career criminal and, after he is shot by police, she hides out with a former bellhop who wants to marry her and make her "respectable."  But, instead, she falls in love with Scotty Cornell, a fast-talking cynical newspaper reporter, who does not realize that she is, in fact, the very gun moll that he has been writing about in his columns.  As she is about to go to prison, he discovers her identity, but pledges to stick by her nevertheless.

Cast 
 Ann Dvorak as Madeleine Maude 'Molly' Louvain
 Lee Tracy as Scott 'Scotty' Cornell
 Richard Cromwell as Jimmy Cook
 Guy Kibbee as Pop, a Policeman
 Leslie Fenton as Nicky Grant
 Frank McHugh as Skeets, a Reporter
 Evalyn Knapp as Doris
 Charles B. Middleton as Police Captain Slade
 Mary Doran as Dance Hall Girl
 Thomas E. Jackson as Police Sergeant
 C. Henry Gordon as Detective Martin
 George Chandler as Reporter
 Louise Beavers as Washroom Attendant (uncredited)
 Wade Boteler as Detective (uncredited)
 Selmer Jackson as Detective Charlie (uncredited)
 Hank Mann as Harley, a Reporter (uncredited)
 Snub Pollard as B. J. Pratt, Bill Collector (uncredited)
 Jacquie Lyn as Ann Marie (uncredited)

External links

1932 films
1932 crime drama films
American crime drama films
Films directed by Michael Curtiz
American black-and-white films
Films about journalists
American films based on plays
First National Pictures films
1930s English-language films
1930s American films
Films scored by Bernhard Kaun